Nevidimka is a rural locality (a settlement) in Lysva, Perm Krai, Russia. The population was 890 as of 2010. There are 14 streets.

Geography 
Nevidimka is located 13 km south of Lysva (the district's administrative centre) by road. Verkh-Lysva is the nearest rural locality.

References 

Rural localities in Perm Krai